Rimas Tuminas (born 20 January 1952 in Kelmė, Lithuania) is a Lithuanian theatre director. He was awarded the State Prize of Russia in 1999. Since 2007 he has been the Artistic director of the Moscow Vakhtangov theatre. With Tuminas, the Vakhtangov Theatre occupied a leading position among the Russian theaters. In 2011, the theater was recognized as the most visited theater in Moscow.

Biography

In 1970-1974 Tuminas studied at the Conservatory of Lithuania. In 1978 he finished GITIS in Moscow (Joseph Tumanov's directing course). From 1979 he was the director of Lithuanian national drama theatre. In 1990 he founded the Little Theatre of Vilnius.

Since 2012 he has organized the "VASARA" annual festival.

Among his well-known productions are "Eugene Onegin", "Uncle Vanya" and "Masquerade".

Awards
 State Prize of the Russian Federation, 
 Russian Festival of Performing Arts Golden Mask Award for Directing Evgenii Onegin (2014), 
 International Stanislavsky Theatre Award
 Crystal Turandot Award
 Golden Nail Award
 Order of Friendship (Russia)

References

Lithuanian theatre directors
People from Kelmė
1952 births
Living people
Russian Academy of Theatre Arts alumni